Igreja Matriz de Viana do Alentejo is a church in Portugal. It is classified as a National Monument.

Viana Alentejo
National monuments in Évora District
Viana do Alentejo